Agdistis malitiosa is a moth in the family Pterophoridae. It is known from Namibia, South Africa, Kenya, Tanzania, Uganda and the Democratic Republic of Congo.

References

Agdistinae
Moths described in 1909
Moths of Africa